The Serbian national ice hockey team is the national men's ice hockey team of Serbia, and a member of the International Ice Hockey Federation. They are currently ranked 30th in the IIHF World Rankings and competes in IIHF World Championship Division I.

Tournament record

Olympic Games

World Championships
Key:

References

External links

IIHF profile
National Teams of Ice Hockey

 
Ice hockey teams in Serbia
National ice hockey teams in Europe
Men's sport in Serbia